Kersi Meher-Homji  is an Australian journalist, author and biographer.  He writes often for The Sydney Morning Herald, and his most notable biography is The Waugh Twins (1998), about Steve and Mark Waugh.  He is of Indian Parsi descent and the nephew of former cricketer Khershed Meherhomji.

In November 2012, his 14th book Cricket Conflicts and Controversies (foreword by the legendary Greg Chappell) was favourably reviewed in "Inside Cricket, Inside Sport, The Roar website and MiD Day.

His previous book, Cricket's Great All-rounders, which profiles briefly the greatest all-rounders in the history of the game, was published in 2008 to a review from Cricinfo staff writer Brydon Coverdale, who felt that some of Homji's inclusions (such as that of Michael Bevan) were generous to say the least.  This liberality, though, was not necessarily a bad thing. "Commendably," wrote Coverdale, "the book extends the traditional definition even further and includes chapters on wicketkeeper-batsmen and those useful types who have excelled in the one-day arena."

In June 2022, Meher-Homji was awarded the Medal of the Order of Australia in the 2022 Queen's Birthday Honours for "service to the multicultural community, and to cricket".

References 
Coverdale, Brydon. "Dated data: Cricket's Great All-rounders." Cricinfo. 26 October 2008. (Retrieved 29 October 2008).

Notes

External links 
Kersi Meher-Homji's Contributions & Profile at  The Roar Sports Opinion accessdate=29 September 2011

Living people
Australian journalists
Australian media personalities
Cricket historians and writers
Australian people of Parsi descent
Indian emigrants to Australia
Recipients of the Medal of the Order of Australia
Australian Zoroastrians
Year of birth missing (living people)